100 Proof may refer to:

 100° proof, alcohol proof
 100 Proof (film), 1997 film
 100 Proof (album), Kellie Pickler album
 100 Proof: The Hangover, Statik Selektah album
 "100 Proof" (song), Kellie Pickler song
 100 Proof (Aged in Soul), an American funk/soul group